Indolium is a cation with molecular formula C8H8N+, and forms chemical compounds in combination with anions. It is an onium ion derived from its parent compound, indole, by the addition of a proton.

References

Indoles